Mahmoud (or Mahmud) Shalaby, or Mahmood Shalabi (or מחמוד שלבי), is a Palestinian actor born on July 19, 1982, in Acre. He has appeared in several films produced or co-produced in France and received the award for best male actor at the Film Festival of La Réunion in 2011 for the role of Naïm in the film A Bottle in the Gaza Sea, directed by Thierry Binisti and adapted from the novel Une bouteille dans la mer de Gaza by Valérie Zenatti. He was honored with two other awards at the same festival.

Life and career 

Shalaby grew up in a poor neighborhood in Acre in marked by urban violence. With his friends, he started a rap and hip-hop group, MWR, which is now dissolved. He then managed a café before being contacted by director Keren Yedaya, who gave him his first role in a non-documentary film. He was interviewed in 2008 in the documentary Slingshot Hip Hop by Jackie Reem Salloum, which covered Palestinian hip-hop in three geographic areas: Israel, the West Bank, and the Gaza Strip.

Shalaby played the role of Toufik in Jaffa, directed by Keren Yedaya and released in 2009, and the role of the Jewish-Algerian singer Salim Halali in Free Men, directed by Ismaël Ferroukhi and released in 2011.

In 2010, Shalaby appeared with Mohammed Bakri in an Arabic short film, The Clock and the Man, adapted from a short story of the same name by the exiled Palestinian novelist Samira Azzam (1927-1967).

He also played Naim, a young Palestinian from Gaza, whose mother was played by Hiam Abbass, opposite a young Israeli woman, Tal, played by Agathe Bonitzer, in a film directed by Thierry Binisti, A Bottle in the Gaza Sea. The film was released in France on February 8, 2012., The film was inspired by a novel by Valérie Zenatti, Une bouteille dans la mer de Gaza.

In The Other Son by Lorraine Lévy, released in France on April 4, 2012, Shalaby played Bilal, ostensibly the brother of Yacine (Mehdi Dehbi), but in fact the brother of Joseph (Jules Sitruk), accidentally exchanged at birth in the confusion created by a bombing.

With an interest in Sufi music, Shalaby plays the kawala, a traditional Egyptian flute, that is seen and heard in The Other Son.

Shalaby was shortlisted in the category of Most Promising Actor for the 38th César Awards in 2013 for his appearance in A Bottle in the Gaza Sea.,

Filmography 
 2007: DAM (documentary), dir. Elliot Manches: himself
 2008: Slingshot Hip Hop (documentary), dir. Jackie Reem Salloum: himself
 2009: Jaffa, dir. Keren Yedaya: Toufik
 2010: The Clock and the Man, dir. Gazi Abu Baker: Fathi
 2011: Free Men, dir. Ismaël Ferroukhi: Salim Halali
 2012: A Bottle in the Gaza Sea, dir. Thierry Binisti: Naïm
 2012: The Other Son, dir. Lorraine Lévy: Bilal, brother of Yacine (as Mahmood Shalabi)
 2014: Shkufim (Hebrew for "Transparents"), dir. Mushon Salmona: Raaid

Awards 
 Film Festival of La Réunion 2011: Best male actor ("Mascarin de la meilleure interprétation masculine") for the role of Naïm in A Bottle in the Gaza Sea (the film also won the "Prix du Public" and the "Prix Coup de cœur du Jury Jeune").

References

External links 
 

21st-century Israeli male actors
Israeli male film actors
21st-century Palestinian actors
Palestinian male actors
Palestinian male film actors
1982 births
People from Acre, Israel
Living people
Arab citizens of Israel
Israeli rappers
Palestinian rappers
Israeli flautists